JDE may refer to:

 Java (programming language) Development Environment
 Jacobs Douwe Egberts, a Dutch coffee and tea company
 Journal of Development Economics
 JD Edwards, a software company
 Jiangdong'er Road station, a station on the Line 7 of Hangzhou Metro in China